Mingshan District may refer to:

Mingshan District, Benxi (明山区), Liaoning, China
Mingshan District, Ya'an (名山区), Sichuan, China